NSAC may refer to:

 National Security Analysis Center, an FBI counter-terrorism initiative
 National Spiritualist Association of Churches
National Society for Autistic Children, the former name of the Autism Society of America
 National Student Advertising Competition, an American advertising competition
 NATO Strategic Airlift Capability
 Nederlandse Studenten Alpen Club, The Netherlands, the national student alpine association
 Nevada Athletic Commission, popularly known as the Nevada State Athletic Commission, a regulatory body for exhibitions of unarmed combat
 North Shore Aero Club, in Auckland, New Zealand
 Nova Scotia Agricultural College, in Nova Scotia, Canada